Driss R. Temsamani (born 1966) is a Miami-based Moroccan American diaspora activist, public speaker, author, and managing director at Citigroup in his role as Latin America Regional Digital Channels and Data Head.

Early life
Temsamani was born in Tangier, Morocco. He is the grand son of General Driss Riffi Temsamani who was named Pasha of the Rif Republic in 1926 then Asila, Larache and Tetuan.
 
Driss emigrated to the United States in 1986. where he established TelQuel Magazine. Years later, Temsamani enrolled himself in business studies. He is a holder of an MBA from Ohio State University, an Executive MBA in Industrial marketing from IAE Universidad Austral in Buenos Aires, Argentina and an Executive Leadership from Harvard.

He is currently based in Miami, Florida where he lives with his wife.

Authorship and lecturing
Temsamani writes about a broad range of topics. In 2004, he was one of the first Moroccan Americans to publish a book in the United States along with Laila Lalami. His book Rewind, a drama story of the human spirit's struggle to find happiness while away from home, was released in 2005.

As a marketing strategist, Temsamani has participated in many industry conferences lecturing about and promoting the theories of "DNA Marketing" and the "Art of Marketing". His specialities include the concepts of diversity marketing and emotional experience.

Citigroup career
Temsamani is Director of Strategic Planning at Citigroup where he is responsible for Marketing and Business Planning. Driss held several roles with Citi in Product Management and Operations and was CIO for the e-Commerce division based in Buenos Aires, Argentina.
 
Temsamani started his Citigroup career as a Senior Consultant in 1995 coming from Telemundo TV Network where he held the position of Operations Director from 1993 to 1995. Prior to that, he worked for Globe Magazine and Worldcare International Insurance.

Community Organization
Driss Temsamani is involved with the Moroccan American community on a broad range of social and advocacy topics. 

Back in 2003, Temsamani co-founded the Morocco Foundation. A year later, he founded and became President of SOS Morocco. 

Temsamani has been President and Board Director of the Moroccan American Coalition since 2008. Later in 2009, he founded the Moroccan Americans for Fritchey Movement. 

Driss is also the Founder and President of the 361 Degrees Institute, a Moroccan American think-tank for Demographic Research & Development based in the United States. In 2012, Temsamani founded the Maghreb Growth Foundation.

Awards
Driss Temsamani is the recipient of The Jerry Goldenberg First place award for direct marketing in 2002 and The Strathmore Who’s Who Leadership Millennium Award in 2000. He was named Visionary of the Year by Compaq in 1999.

References

Living people
Citigroup people
American non-fiction writers
Moroccan emigrants to the United States
Ohio State University Fisher College of Business alumni
People from Tangier
1966 births
Harvard Business School alumni
Riffian people